Syamdhar is an Indian film director who works in the Malayalam film industry. Prithviraj starrer 7th Day is his debut movie as a director, which was a crime thriller. In 2017, he made his second movie Pullikkaran Staraa with Mammootty.

Filmography

References

External links 
 

Living people
People from Ernakulam district
Film directors from Kerala
Indian male film actors
Malayalam film directors
Year of birth missing (living people)